Rebecca Toolan (born September 1943)  is an American television actress best known for playing Teena Mulder, Fox Mulder's mother, on The X-Files.

Early life and career
Although she has lived and worked in Canada for years, Toolan was actually born in the United States and grew up in the U.S. state of Iowa. After teaching in Brazil, she got her master's degree at the University of Iowa and then taught theater at the Universities of Winnipeg and Manitoba. She married Paul Toolan in 1968 before marrying Max Sucharov.

Her feature film credits include Little Women, Knight Moves, and The Accused.

Filmography

References

External links

1943 births
Actresses from Iowa
American television actresses
University of Iowa alumni
20th-century American actresses
21st-century American actresses
Living people